Petrus Schenck, or Pieter, or Peter Schenk the Elder (baptized: 26 December 1660 – between 12 August and 17 November 1711 in Leipzig) was a German engraver and cartographer active in Amsterdam and Leipzig.

Life
The engraver and map publisher Peter Schenk was born in 1660 in Elberfeld. He moved to Amsterdam in 1675 and became a student of Gerard Valck specializing in mezzotint.  Valck was married to Maria Bloteling, the sister of the Amsterdam engraver Abraham Bloteling. In 1687 Schenk married Gerard's sister Agatha Valck. In 1694, together with Valck, he bought some of the copperplates of the artdealer and cartographer Johannes Janssonius. Along with Valck and Bloteling, he produced prints for the London market, though it is not known if he ever went there with them.

Until 1700 he lived in the Jordaan, then he moved to Dam Square or to Leipzig, where he opened a shop, selling maps and art. He was a regular visitor to the trade fair Leipziger Messe in Leipzig, where he died.
He had three sons who became engravers. His eldest son Peter Schenk the Younger was also a noted cartographer and art dealer who continued his father's shop in Leipzig. His sons Jan and Leonard stayed in Amsterdam and probably continued their father's workshop. His daughter Maria married Leonard Valck, the son of Gerard, who continued Gerard's workshop.

Works 
 Schenk drew several Amsterdam burgomasters: Coenraad van Beuningen, Johannes Hudde and Nicolaas Witsen. 
 He owned an Album Amicorum that was signed was several famous people and runs from 1700 until 1713. Schenk was appointed as court artist in Dresden. He published numerous maps and a drawing of Saxonia.
 Continentis Italiae Pars Australior: Sive Regnum Neapolitanum; Hispaniae Obediens: Subdivisum In suos Districtus, Terras, Atque Principatus, Quibus adjectae Sicilia, In Valles tripartita et Contra Turcas ejus Propugnaculum Malta Insula - Amsterdam, ca. 1703. digitized by the Universitäts- und Landesbibliothek Düsseldorf
 Works by or about Peter Schenk in the catalog of the Deutschen Nationalbibliothek

References

External links 
 

1660 births
1711 deaths
German engravers
Dutch Golden Age printmakers
Artists from Amsterdam
People from Elberfeld